Gilberto Ojeda Camacho (born 7 March 1957) is a Mexican politician from the Institutional Revolutionary Party. From 2006 to 2009, he served as Deputy of the LX Legislature of the Mexican Congress representing Sinaloa.

References

1957 births
Living people
Politicians from Sinaloa
Institutional Revolutionary Party politicians
21st-century Mexican politicians
Members of the Congress of Sinaloa
People from Guamúchil
Deputies of the LX Legislature of Mexico
Members of the Chamber of Deputies (Mexico) for Sinaloa